Sorelle Lumière is an album by Italian singer Mina, issued in 1992. This is a double album issued as "CD. 1" and "CD. 2 ".

The Album

The album draws inspiration and pays homage to the Lumière brothers. The cover image sees the singer transformed into "a film projector with two coils instead of hair, the gears in the brain and the images that arise from the eyes". The images on the inside of the disc sleeve sees Mina become "dark" and, looking in the mirror, notice a "M" drawn on her back, quote of the movie M - Il mostro di Düsseldorf (M - The Monster of Düsseldorf) by Fritz Lang.The whole disc becomes "a film that unfolds in his head, a long movie twenty songs maybe an old melodrama, strong colors, a sentimental story without a happy end ".  "If the first volume is elegant, intense" - "more diverse and suffused atmospheres velvety", in the album of unreleased "the broad melodies are full of sadness, moans of desperate women and love" ,  "a firework of unpredictable invention,  of complex stories, twisted, men who do not understand, of women who suffer, they get bored, they dream".

The Tracks

In Anima near, in which Mina good counselor and also a man gives way to a Mina angry and disappointed.

In Se Poi, Carlo Marrale writes the lyric  “soffro, bevo e mi rovino, lo so”, perché “le eroine subiscono sempre” which means "I suffer, I drink and I ruined, I know," because "the heroines suffer forever".

In Uomo ferito, Mina becomes more comprehensive and becomes a comforter and says (uomo ferito come un passero che non vola più) - " a wounded man as a bird that does not fly anymore” regains the light thanks to the love of his woman.

The song Neve, which opens with a Gregorian chant, sees the beginning of a long and fruitful collaboration between Mina and Audio2. The song was also produced a short promotional video which featured Platinette in the role of Rita Hayworth, version Lady of Shanghai, repeating the famous scene of the shooting in the mirror.

In La follia, Mina sings of the final madness that “sfocia nel fogliettone di un torbido delitto” - "flows into a serial story,  a murky crime" (Ormai non sento più la voce sua da vile incantatore... Il mio pugnale è lì, piantato lì, al centro del suo cuore... ) - "I no longer feel the voice from his vile charmer ... My dagger is there, planted there, at the center of his heart. .. " - and represents the  final act of this new chapter where Mina retracts like a monster, marked by the sign M, and the subject of fetishism from cinema".

The album also covers three songs, Come stai, Non avere te and  Robinson,  originally released on Massimiliano Pani’s debut album, L'occasione (1991). Come stai was re-recorded as a duet with Pani for this album.

Track listing

CD. 1

CD. 2

Other VersionsE poi...''

Original version released on the album Frutta e verdura.
Live version released on the album Mina Live '78.
Spanish version, titled "Y que?", released on the album Colección Latina.
German version, titled "Und dann", released on the album Heisser Sand.
English version, titled "Runaway", released as a dual single titled Runaway/I Still Love You.
French version, titled "Et puis ça sert à quoi" from the album Mina (French version '76)

References

1990 albums
Mina (Italian singer) albums